Fly High Run Far is a 1991 South Korean film directed by Im Kwon-taek. It was chosen as Best Film at the Grand Bell Awards.

Plot
A film about Choe Si-hyeong, a leader of the Donghak Peasant Revolution of late 19th-century Korea.

This film revolves around the life of Choi Shi-hyong, head of the religious sect, Chondogyo, in the later part of the Chosun Kingdom. He is constantly sought and harassed by the authorities. In 1864, Choi Jeh-woo, the reformist and founder of the Chondogyo sect is executed on charges of "deluding the world and deceiving the people". His successor, Choi Shi-hyong, begins to receive a ground swell of support from an increasing number of people. He then finds himself the subject of oppression by the court. He is separated from his family and goes to hide in a hermitage in the Taeback Mountains. With the belief that his wife is dead, Choi burns the tablet delicated to her and flees to an even more remote region of the mountains.

Cast
Lee Deok-hwa as Hae-weol
Lee Hye-young
Kim Myung-gon as Jeong Bong-jun
Park Ji-hun as Kang-su
Lee Suk-koo as Pan-ok
Choi Dong-joon as Gye-dong
Kim Gil-ho as Su-un
Kim Ki-ju as Lee Pil-jye

Bibliography
Fly High, Run Far at the Busan International Film Festival

References

External links

Films directed by Im Kwon-taek
1990s Korean-language films
South Korean drama films
Best Picture Grand Bell Award winners